Kosad railway station is a railway station on the Western Railway network in the state of Gujarat, India. It serves Kosad town. Passenger and MEMU trains halt here.

References

Railway stations in Surat district
Vadodara railway division